Arizona Miner (alternatively the Arizona Weekly Miner, Miner, or Weekly Miner) was a newspaper published in Prescott, Arizona Territory, from 1868 to 1885 and circulated throughout Yavapai County. The paper merged with the Arizona Weekly Journal in 1885 to create the Arizona Weekly Journal-Miner, which was published until 1934. It underwent a succession of owners and changes in its publishing frequency as well as its political leanings.

History
The predecessor paper, the Republican Fort Whipple Arizona Miner, was established in 1864 at Fort Whipple as a monthly. It was owned by then Territorial Secretary Richard C. McCormick who purchased a press in Santa Fe, New Mexico on his initial journey to the territory and transported it in government wagons along with his other personal belongings. The first publisher was Tisdale A. Hand. The first issue was published on March 9, 1864, making it the oldest newspaper in Arizona. The paper was published under military protection by staff who had "rifles strapped to their backs." Later that year, after the first six issues, McCormick moved the publication to Prescott, the new capital of the Territory. Emmet A. Bentley, editor from July 1866 was shot by Apache Indians on Weaver Mountain in February 1867 and died a few days later in the paper's office at age 27. Bentley was born in Burlington, Iowa and came to Arizona in 1863.

Although McCormick established the paper as "the creature of the new territorial government", the paper had little political content in its early years, aside from reporting on the reelection of President Lincoln in 1864 and on meetings of the Arizona Territorial Legislature.  Still, William F. Turner, the Chief Justice of the Territorial Supreme Court of Arizona and a political foe, felt that McCormick unduly benefited from being the owner and controller of the Miner.

In 1867, McCormick sold the paper to John H. Marion, a native of New Orleans, Louisiana who came to Arizona in his 20s to prospect. He stayed to promote mining and Arizona's political rights. During Marion's tenure the paper became highly politicized. Marion, a Democrat, was said to have a "combative and racist perspective that made itself known through his often aggressive and biting criticism of others". Marion intended the Miner to be both "The Official Paper of Arizona" and an "Organ of the White People of Arizona." Marion published weekly beginning in August 1867 and said he grew the paper from a circulation of less than 75 with a half column of paid advertising to 672 with "several columns" of paid advertising.

In 1868 Benjamin H. Weaver joined the publishing staff and the paper's frequency increased from semi-monthly to weekly; it was also renamed the Weekly Arizona Miner. After Weaver left in 1874, the paper was renamed the Arizona Weekly Miner. Over the next few years the staff changed again, with Thomas J. Butler becoming editor and part-owner in 1875, then selling his interest in 1876. Charles W. Beach thereafter assumed the duties of editor, and Marion sold his interest to Beach in 1877. Under Beach, the paper's political leanings returned to their Republican roots and the name was changed back to the Weekly Arizona Miner. In 1882 Beach planned to sell the paper to Samuel N. Holmes, but Holmes died before the deal was signed.

Merger
Despite ongoing financial difficulties, Beach continued to publish the newspaper for several more years. In late 1885, John C. Martin, the editor of Prescott's Arizona Weekly Journal, proposed a merger deal. The two papers combined to create the Arizona Weekly Journal-Miner, with Martin as editor.

Later history
A fire on July 14, 1900, destroyed the publishing office. In response, a temporary daily was published for about a month until regular operations could resume in a small brick building on West Gurley Street.

In 1903, the name of the paper was changed yet again to the Weekly Arizona Journal-Miner. In 1904, the paper began using a linotype machine and became a franchise of the Associated Press.

In 1908, John W. Milnes purchased the paper and took over as editor; he changed the name to the Weekly Journal-Miner. Milnes retained control of the paper for nearly fifteen years. Needing more space, the publishing office moved to a two-story building at Cortez and Union streets in 1914 with a Goss web-perfecting press.

The last proprietors of the paper were Arthur John Doud, publisher, and A. V. Napier, manager, who acquired the publication on July 1, 1929, and operated it until its closure in April 1934.

Daily edition
From December 1873 to August 1885, a daily edition, the Arizona Daily Miner, was also published. The Arizona Journal, a Republican-leaning paper established in 1883 merged with Daily Miner to become the Prescott Journal-Miner.

Mastheads

Key people

Notes

References

External links
 Arizona Miner on the Arizona Memory Project
 Arizona Weekly Journal-Miner on the Arizona Memory Project
 Arizona Weekly Miner on the Arizona Memory Project
 Weekly Arizona Journal-Miner on the Arizona Memory Project
 The Weekly Arizona Miner (1868–1873) on the Arizona Memory Project
 The Weekly Arizona Miner (1877–1885) on the Arizona Memory Project
 Weekly Journal-Miner on the Arizona Memory Project

Newspapers published in Arizona
Prescott, Arizona
Arizona Territory
Publications established in 1864
Publications disestablished in 1934
1864 establishments in Arizona Territory